is Japanese singer songwriter Fayray's eighth studio album and first in 3 years. The album was released January 14, 2009.

Track listing

Charts and sales

References

External links

2009 albums
Fayray albums